David Danko (born 16 November 1992) is a German footballer who plays as a midfielder for SV Babelsberg 03.

External links

 

1992 births
Living people
German footballers
Association football midfielders
Regionalliga players
2. Liga (Austria) players
Floridsdorfer AC players
Berliner AK 07 players
SV Babelsberg 03 players
German expatriate footballers
German expatriate sportspeople in Austria
Expatriate footballers in Austria
SC Staaken players